Country Comfort may refer to:

Country Comfort (TV series), an American comedy series released by Netflix on March 19, 2021
Country Comfort KWVT-LD music video show
Country Comfort Motel Millbank, Queensland
"Country Comfort", song by Elton John from Tumbleweed Connection
Country Comfort, band led by Billy Kaui and members of Kalapana (band)